Oliver Burgess (born 12 October 1981) is a professional footballer who last played for Southern Football League Division One Central side Slough Town.

Signed from league rivals Kettering Town as the first signing for the 2006-7 campaign. Burgess has made a number of appearances in the Football League for both Northampton Town and Queens Park Rangers before his career was cut short by a serious knee injury. It was at QPR that he scored his first career goal in a 4–0 win over Swindon Town.

But non-league football has seen him return to his best once again and he has been a regular scorer from the middle of the park in recent seasons. A versatile player who can operate on the right hand side and in a central role.

References

External links

1981 births
Living people
People from Ascot, Berkshire
English footballers
Association football midfielders
Queens Park Rangers F.C. players
Northampton Town F.C. players
Kettering Town F.C. players
Nuneaton Borough F.C. players
Slough Town F.C. players
English Football League players
Southern Football League players